Oom-pah, Oompah or Umpapa is an onomatopoeic term describing the rhythmical sound of a deep brass instrument in combination with the response of other instruments or registers in a band, a form of background ostinato.

The oom-pah sound is usually made by the tuba alternating between the root (tonic) of the chord and the 5th (dominant) — this sound is said to be the oom.  The pah is played on the off-beats by higher-pitched instruments such as the clarinet, accordion or trombone. Oompah is often associated with Volkstümliche Musik, a form of popular German music, and with polka. In triple time genres such as the waltz it is oom-pah-pah.

The musical Oliver! contains a song named "Oom-Pah-Pah", which is named after the oom-pah.

A more modern variation is the playing of contemporary pop and rock songs in an Oompah style, by bands such as Global Kryner (Austria) and Oompah Brass (UK) (who dubbed the style "Oompop"). The American jam band Phish features the oom-pah-pah in their song "Harpua".

See also
Duple time, a musical metre
Carter Family picking, a guitar playing technique 
Humppa, a style of music from Finland 
Eläkeläiset, a Finnish humppa band

References

Accompaniment
Bass (sound)
Rhythm section